Elbert is a census-designated place (CDP) in Throckmorton County, Texas, United States. The population was 30 at the 2010 census.

Geography
Elbert is located at  (33.274758, -99.002109). According to the United States Census Bureau in 2000, the CDP has a total area of 11.7 square miles (30.4 km2), all of it land.

Demographics

2010 census

As of the census of 2010, there were 30 people, a decrease of 46.43% since 2000 (26 people). The racial makeup of the CDP was 96.67% White (29 people) and 3.33% Native American (1 person). The CDP did not have any people from Hispanic or Latino of any race.

2000 census

As of the census of 2000, there were 56 people, 24 households, and 16 families residing in the CDP. The population density was 4.8 people per square mile (1.8/km2). There were 32 housing units at an average density of 2.7/sq mi (1.1/km2). The racial makeup of the CDP was 92.86% White, 5.36% Native American, and 1.79% from two or more races.

There were 24 households, out of which 29.2% had children under the age of 18 living with them, 62.5% were married couples living together, 4.2% had a female householder with no husband present, and 33.3% were non-families. 33.3% of all households were made up of individuals, and 16.7% had someone living alone who was 65 years of age or older. The average household size was 2.33 and the average family size was 3.00.

In the CDP, the population was spread out, with 26.8% under the age of 18, 1.8% from 18 to 24, 30.4% from 25 to 44, 12.5% from 45 to 64, and 28.6% who were 65 years of age or older. The median age was 38 years. For every 100 females, there were 93.1 males. For every 100 females age 18 and over, there were 105.0 males.

The median income for a household in the CDP was $27,188, and the median income for a family was $33,125. Males had a median income of $21,250 versus $33,750 for females. The per capita income for the CDP was $23,670. There were no families and 2.9% of the population living below the poverty line, including no under eighteens and none of those over 64.

Climate
The climate in this area is characterized by hot, humid summers and generally mild to cool winters.  According to the Köppen Climate Classification system, Elbert has a humid subtropical climate, abbreviated "Cfa" on climate maps.

References

Census-designated places in Throckmorton County, Texas
Census-designated places in Texas